Private Joseph B. Chambers (May 4, 1833 – October 8, 1909) was an American soldier who fought in the American Civil War. Chambers received the country's highest award for bravery during combat, the Medal of Honor, for his action at the Battle of Fort Stedman on 25 March 1865. He was honored with the award on 27 July 1871.

Biography
Chambers was born in Beaver County, Pennsylvania on 4 May 1833. He enlisted in the 100th Pennsylvania Volunteer Infantry. Chambers died on 8 October 1909 and his remains are interred at the Oak Park Cemetery in Pennsylvania.

Medal of Honor citation

See also

List of American Civil War Medal of Honor recipients: A–F

References

1833 births
1909 deaths
People of Pennsylvania in the American Civil War
Union Army officers
United States Army Medal of Honor recipients
American Civil War recipients of the Medal of Honor